Villaspeciosa is a comune (municipality) in the Province of South Sardinia in the Italian region Sardinia, located about  northwest of Cagliari.

Villaspeciosa borders the following municipalities: Decimomannu, Decimoputzu, Siliqua, Uta.

Demographic evolution

References

Cities and towns in Sardinia